Ammachi Plavu literally translated from Malayalam, it means grandmother Jack-fruit tree or  an old Jackfruit tree, Located in inside of  Neyyattinkara Sree Krishna Swami Temple in Thiruvananthapuram Kerala.

History
Ammachi Plavu is legendarily connected with the period of Anizham Thirunal  Marthanda Varma (1729 -1758). The 'Ettuveetil Pillamar' had challenged Marthanda Varma who ruled Travancore. Ettuveetil Pillamar, who had a decisive influence in the country, had taken steps to end Marthanda Varma's supremacy and rule. Marthanda Varma had often gone into hiding in fear of the Ettuveetil Pillamar and he also regularly changed his residence so as not to be identified by Ettuveetil Pillamar. Marthanda Varma, certain that the enemy was behind him, crossed the Neyyar river and reached the opposite side. When he was trying to hide himself in a safe place, he saw a boy who was grazing cows. The boy hid him in the hollow trunk of a jackfruit tree and thus helped him escape his enemies. Jackfruit tree which helped the king save his life came to be known as "Ammachi Plavu". At present, the hollow trunk is preserved by the Kerala State Department of Archaeology. Later on, Marthanda Varma found that it was none other than Lord Krishna himself who saved him from his enemies, and he constructed a temple to him near the Jackfruit tree, which is now a very popular tourist spot in Southern Kerala.

See also
Neyyattinkara Sree Krishna Swami Temple
Marthanda Varma
Ettuveetil Pillamar
Neyyar (river)

References

Trees
History of Kerala
Historical geology
Kingdom of Travancore